Hordiyenko is a Ukrainian-language surname. It may be transliterated in Russian as Gordiyenko and Romanian as Gordienco. It is a patronymic surname, derived from the first name Hordiy, derived from Saint Gordianus.

A variant is Гордеенко  [Gordeyenko/Hordeyenko/Gordeenko].

People

Hordiyenko
 Artem Hordiyenko (born 1991), Ukrainian footballer
 Dmytro Hordiyenko (born 1983), Ukrainian footballer
 Kost Hordiyenko (?? – 1733), Zaporozhian Cossack Kosh otaman
 Yakiv Hordiyenko (1925–1942), Soviet partisan

Gordienko
 George Gordienko (1928–2002), Canadian wrestler and artist
 Natalia Gordienko (born 1987), Moldovan singer and dancer

Gordiyenko
 Dmitry Gordiyenko (born 1986), Kazakhstani swimmer
 Ruslan Gordiyenko (born 1995), Russian footballer

See also
 
 
 Gordeev
 Gordievsky

Ukrainian-language surnames
Patronymic surnames